Colin Sinclair may refer to:

 Colin Sinclair (footballer) (born 1947), Scottish former footballer
 Colin Sinclair (boxer) (1890–1970), Australian boxer
 Colin Sinclair (politician) (1876–1956), Australian politician
 Colin Sinclair (tennis) (born 1994), Northern Mariana Islands tennis player
 Colin Sinclair (minister), Church of Scotland minister and Moderator of the General Assembly of the Church of Scotland (2019-2020)
 Col Sinclair (1896–1959), Australian rules footballer